Oxford Libraries Information System (OLIS) was an online union catalog of books held by the libraries of the University of Oxford, England, which include the Bodleian Libraries group, and also those faculty libraries which are not members of the group, and the libraries of individual colleges. It operated the Geac ADVANCE integrated library system (ILS). Prior to 1996 it operated DOBIS/LIBIS software (which itself replaced the LS/2000 system). Oxford University Library Services (OULS) issued a tender for new software in 2005 which culminated in the selection of the Virtua system from VTLS, but in August 2008 Oxford announced that the implementation would not go forward. In 2010 it was confirmed that Aleph from Ex Libris would replace Geac ADVANCE. Aleph was implemented in July 2011.

OLIS was deprecated with the move to Aleph in 2011 and replaced by a new Integrated Library System (ILS). The functions offered by OLIS were moved to Search Oxford Libraries Online (SOLO).

References

Further reading
 Burnett, Peter P. 'Emerging from the Bibliographic Wilderness: Catalogue Automation in the Bodleian Library, University of Oxford.' Simultaneously published in Cataloging & Classification Quarterly 30(1) (2000) pp. 51–72 and in Carter, Ruth C. (ed.) Managing Cataloging and the Organization of Information: Philosophies, Practices, and Challenges at the Onset of the 21st Century (Haworth, 2000).
 Price, Dave. 'Implementation of a new integrated library system.' In: Heaney, Michael & Cannon, Catríona (eds.) Transforming the Bodleian (De Gruyter Saur, 2012).
 Wilkinson, Laura. 'Retreat from Advance' Laura's Dark Archive, 6 July 2011.

External links 
 Oxford Libraries Information System (OLIS) (defunct)
Search Oxford Libraries Online
 Oxford University Library Services (defunct)
Bodleian Libraries

Libraries of the University of Oxford
Library catalogues